William "Bill" Edward Payne  (born July 4, 1933) is a former provincial politician from Alberta, Canada. He served as a member of the Legislative Assembly of Alberta from 1979 to 1993 sitting with the governing Progressive Conservative caucus. Premier Peter Lougheed appointed Payne to the Executive Council of Alberta. He briefly served as a minister without portfolio from 1982 to 1986.

Payne was a member of the Church of Jesus Christ of Latter-day Saints.

Political career
Payne ran as a Progressive Conservative candidate in the 1979 Alberta general election in the electoral district of Calgary-Fish Creek. He won his first term defeating three other candidates with a landslide majority. Payne ran for a second term in office in the 1982 Alberta general election. He increased his majority finishing nearly 15,000 votes ahead of second place candidate Byron Chenger of the Western Canada Concept. After the election Payne was appointed minister without portfolio by Premier Peter Lougheed. He held that cabinet portfolio for a single term.

Payne won his third term and losing almost 10,000 votes from his 1982 total running in the 1986 Alberta general election. He still finished well ahead winning the district with a third consecutive landslide. He ran for his fourth and final term in the 1989 Alberta genera election. His popular vote dropped again as support for Liberal candidate Wayne Gillis surged finishing approximately 1,500 votes behind Payne. He retired at dissolution of the Assembly in 1993.

References

External links
Legislative Assembly of Alberta Members Listing

1933 births
Living people
Canadian Latter Day Saints
Members of the Executive Council of Alberta
Politicians from Windsor, Ontario
Progressive Conservative Association of Alberta MLAs